Duterte is a surname with significant usage in the Philippines. Notable people with the surname include:

Elizabeth Zimmerman Duterte (born 1948), former wife of Rodrigo Duterte and former aspiring politician
 (1847–1887), French botanist
Henrietta Duterte (1817–1903), American philanthropist and abolitionist
Janet Duterte or Keanna Reeves (born 1970), Filipino actress
Melina Duterte or Jay Som (born 1994), American musician, singer, songwriter and music producer
Paolo Duterte (born 1975), Filipino businessman and politician, son of Rodrigo Duterte
Rodrigo Duterte (born 1945), aka "DU30", Filipino lawyer, politician and former President of the Philippines
Ronald Duterte (1934–2005), Filipino politician and lawyer, former mayor of Cebu City
Sara Duterte (born 1978), Filipino lawyer, politician, and former Mayor of Davao City; daughter of Rodrigo Duterte;15th and current Vice President of the Philippines
Sebastian Duterte (born 1987), Filipino surfer and politician, son of Rodrigo Duterte
Soledad Duterte (1916–2012), Filipino teacher and activist, mother of Rodrigo Duterte
Vicente Duterte (1911–1968), Filipino lawyer and politician, father of Rodrigo Duterte

References